Yoga to the People was a chain of United States-based yoga studios which offered free or donation-funded modern yoga classes to any kind of student, including casual practitioners.

Services
Yoga to the People had a business model that tried to provide classes to all people regardless of their ability to pay. Yoga to the People founder Greg Gumucio modeled the cost model after the ideas of yoga teacher and Power Yoga founder Bryan Kest.

The studio in East Village, Manhattan had eight classes a day with up to 150 people in attendance at a time between the different rooms, and was sometimes at capacity.

Copyright claims on Bikram Yoga

Bikram Choudhury claimed from 2002 onwards that his modern yoga practice, Bikram Yoga, was under copyright and that it could not be taught or presented by anyone whom he had not authorized. In 2011 he started a lawsuit against Yoga to the People. As a result of that lawsuit, the United States Copyright Office issued a clarification that yoga asanas could not be copyrighted in the way claimed by Bikram, and that Yoga to the People and others could continue to freely teach these exercises.

Closure
Yoga to the People serviced thousands of students from the time it first opened its doors in 2007. Yoga to the People closed during the Covid-19 pandemic after multiple accusations of tax fraud, sexual assault, labor violations, racial discriminations, other crimes and bad business practices which were made public through an Instagram account @yttpshadowwork. As of August 2022 the leadership of Yoga to the People have been arrested for tax fraud. The website remains open with original class podcasts for anyone who wants to take class without payment.

Founder Greg Gumucio has been accused of sexual assault.

References

External links

Yoga schools